Jackson Hill is an unincorporated community in Hamilton Township, Sullivan County, in the U.S. state of Indiana.

The community is part of the Terre Haute Metropolitan Statistical Area.

History
A post office was established at Jackson Hill in 1900, and remained in operation until it was discontinued in 1906.

Geography

References

Unincorporated communities in Sullivan County, Indiana
Unincorporated communities in Indiana
Terre Haute metropolitan area